Gene Porter was a musician.

Gene or Eugene Porter may also refer to:

Eugene Porter, fictional character in The Walking Dead
Eugene H. Porter, New York physician, farmer, and New York Commissioner of the Department of Health and Food and Markets Division
Gene Porter (Revolution), fictional character in the TV series Revolution
Gene Porter, owner of Dixie's BBQ

See also
Gene Stratton-Porter, American author, nature photographer, and naturalist